A Sides Win: Singles 1992–2005 is a compilation album by Canadian power pop quartet Sloan. It was released on May 3, 2005, and debuted at #15 on the Canadian Albums Chart.

The album is a compilation of 14 previously released singles, plus two new songs, "All Used Up" and "Try to Make It". A special version of the album also contains a second disc, a DVD containing the music videos of each of the songs, plus interviews and other material.

The album's title is a play on  "A Side Wins", a song on Sloan's 1996 release One Chord to Another.

Track listing
 "Underwhelmed" (Chris Murphy; from Smeared) – 4:45
 "500 Up" (Andrew Scott; from Smeared) – 4:16
 "Coax Me" (Chris Murphy; from Twice Removed) – 3:26
 "People of the Sky" (Andrew Scott; from Twice Removed) – 3:38
 "The Good in Everyone" (Patrick Pentland; from One Chord to Another) – 2:08
 "Everything You've Done Wrong" (Patrick Pentland; from One Chord to Another) – 3:27
 "The Lines You Amend" (Jay Ferguson; from One Chord to Another) – 2:32
 "Money City Maniacs" (Patrick Pentland; from Navy Blues) – 3:54
 "She Says What She Means" (Chris Murphy; from Navy Blues) – 3:01
 "Losing California" (Patrick Pentland; from Between the Bridges) – 3:06
 "Friendship" (Patrick Pentland; from Between the Bridges) – 3:25
 "If It Feels Good Do It" (Patrick Pentland; from Pretty Together) – 3:56
 "The Other Man" (Chris Murphy; from Pretty Together) – 3:53
 "The Rest of My Life" (Chris Murphy; from Action Pact) –  2:46
 "All Used Up" (Patrick Pentland; new song) – 2:49
 "Try to Make It" (Chris Murphy; new song) – 3:44

B-sides
 "I Thought I Was Ready for You" (Jay Ferguson; Japan import)
 "Tell Me Something I Don't Know" (Chris Murphy; Japan import)

References

2005 greatest hits albums
Sloan (band) albums